Paya Rumput is a state constituency in Malacca, Malaysia, that has been represented in the Melaka State Legislative Assembly.

The state constituency was first contested in 1995 and is mandated to return a single Assemblyman to the Melaka State Legislative Assembly under the first-past-the-post voting system.

Definition 
The Paya Rumput constituency contains the polling districts of Hujong Padang, Kerubong, Pantai Cheng, Cheng Perdana, Cheng and Tanjung Minyak.

Demographics

History

Polling districts
According to the gazette issued on 31 October 2022, the Paya Rumput constituency has a total of 6 polling districts.

Representation history

Election results
The electoral results for the Paya Rumput state constituency in 2004, 2008, 2013, 2018 and 2021 are as follows.

References

Malacca state constituencies